The following highways are numbered 690:

Canada
 Alberta Highway 690
 New Brunswick Route 690
Saskatchewan Highway 690

United States